TSOG: The Thing That Ate the Constitution is a book by Robert Anton Wilson published in 2002. TSOG stands for 'Tsarist Occupational Government,' stemming from Wilson's belief that there were strong parallels with the oppressive Tsarist government of pre-revolutionary Russia and the United States government under George W. Bush. It focuses on issues such as civil liberties, the influence of faith-based organisations on the government and the war on drugs.

References

2002 non-fiction books
Books by Robert Anton Wilson